The Andy Warhol Diaries is an American documentary streaming television limited series from writer, director Andrew Rossi, and executive producer Ryan Murphy, based on the 1989 non-fiction book of the same name by Andy Warhol, as edited by Pat Hackett. The series features the famed pop artist narrating his own diary entries through the employment of AI (voiced by Bill Irwin then morphed using Resemble AI). The series premiered on Netflix on March 9, 2022, consisting of six episodes.

Among those who were interviewed in the course of the series are Bob Colacello, Pat Hackett, Christopher Makos, Rob Lowe, Jerry Hall, Mariel Hemingway, Tony Shafrazi, Mary Boone, Vincent Fremont, Shelly Dunn Fremont, Jamie Wyeth, Glenn Ligon, Larry Gagosian, José Carlos Diaz, David LaChapelle, Wilfredo Rosado, Peter Wise, Donna De Salvo, Jay Johnson, Kenny Scharf, Alan Wanzenberg, Michael Chow, Patrick Moore, John Waters, Greg Tate, Julian Schnabel, Marc Balet, Lee Quinones, Donald Warhola, Futura 2000, Daniela Morera, Debbie Harry, Paige Powell, John Reinhold, Gigi Williams, Jay Gould, Jeffrey Deitch, Jessica Beck, Cornelia Guest, Madelyn Kaye, Lisa Birnbach, Fab 5 Freddy, Benjamin Liu, Lucy Sante, Tama Janowitz, Katy Dobbs, Whit Stillman, and Jane Holzer.

Synopsis
Warhol in 1976 via dictating entries on the phone commences to take stock of his life in great detail in a diary format. The series also follows his relationships with Paramount Communications executive Jon Gould, interior designer Jed Johnson, and fellow artist Jean-Michel Basquiat.

Episodes

Critical reception
On Rotten Tomatoes, the series holds an approval rating of 96% based on 23 reviews, with an average rating of 8.2/10. The website's critics consensus reads, "Employing some risky stylistic flourishes that Andy Warhol himself might have approved of, these Diaries are a revelatory glimpse into the inner life of a purposefully unknowable artist." On Metacritic, the series has a weighted average score of 78 out of 100, based on 7 critics, indicating "generally favorable reviews".

Jack Seale of The Guardian described the series as "a startling biopic told with the artist's own words". Daniel D'Addario of Variety wrote that "the series both summons Warhol's affectless voice and insists on finding the intellect and emotion behind the coolly evaluating gaze".

Awards and nominations

References

External links
 
 

2022 American television series debuts
2022 American television series endings
2020s American documentary television series
2020s American LGBT-related television series
2020s American television miniseries
Documentary television series about art
English-language Netflix original programming
Netflix original documentary television series
Television shows based on non-fiction books
Works by Ryan Murphy (writer)
Diaries